Meidingu Sameirang was a Meetei ruler of Ningthouja dynasty of Ancient Manipur (Antique Kangleipak). He is the successor of Naophangba and the predecessor of Ura Konthouba. He was born to King Naophangba of Ningthouja dynasty and Queen , the princess of Khuman dynasty. In 518 AD, he defeated Kwakpa Thawanthaba, the chief of the Angom principality and took possession of his territory after killing him.

He founded the "Phaida Loishang" (eunuch institution) led by a head for the first time in the kingdom. During his reign, Yumnaks (Meitei families) like Yengkhom, Keithellakpam and Kheirom are found mentioning in the chronicles. These are the descendants of Thamanglang, the step brother of King Sameirang. His name is mentioned in the inscription found in Khoibu region.

References

Other websites 

 Manipur, Past and Present: Nagas & Kuki-Chins
 Ethnic Relations Among the People of North-East India
 Archaeology in Manipur
 The History of Manipur: An early period
Kings of Ancient Manipur
Pages with unreviewed translations